Sports in Saskatchewan include ice skating, speed skating, curling, curling bonspiels, snowboarding, snow golf, broomball, ice hockey and badminton. Summer sports abound: among these are school track and field days, community rodeos, golf tournaments, and sporting events such as baseball, softball, and snowmobile, snowmobile rallies. School teams usually feature baseball, basketball, field hockey, association football (soccer), lacrosse, football, rugby, and wrestling. Popular individual sports include auto racing, boxing, cycling, golf, hiking, horse racing, ice skating, skateboarding, skiing, swimming, tennis, triathlon, track and field, and water sports. Other sports include tobogganing, sailing, rowing, trap shooting, lawn bowling, and horseshoes. Saskatchewan speed skaters have enjoyed recent success in the Olympics in Salt Lake City and Turin. The Saskatchewan Olympic medalists include Catriona Le May Doan, Jason Parker and Justin Warsylewicz. Saskatchewan's most loved sport is Curling. They have several club teams for it and also have fans cheering their every move.

Major league sports teams

Major junior ice hockey teams

History
The early first nations started playing team sports with lacrosse. Immigration, rural communities and one room school houses soon saw organised sports and competitions being held in sports such as baseball, basketball, Association football or soccer, track and field and ice hockey.  Broomball was recorded as being played in Saskatchewan as early as 1909. Horse racing and harness racing were two popular events as many early settlers were avid and expert horsemen.

Official sport

Curling

Curling is the provincial sport of Saskatchewan, and many towns and villages across Saskatchewan feature curling rinks. One of the first curling clubs of Saskatchewan was featured at Moosomin which arose as early as 1880.  The first world curling title was won by the Canadian team from Regina, Saskatchewan, skipped by Ernie Richardson. An annual Canadian women's curling championship is the Scotties Tournament of Hearts. The winner of which also gets to return to the following years' tournament as "Team Canada" as well as, the winner represents Canada at the women's world curling championships. The Tim Hortons Brier, also known as the Brier, is the annual Canadian men's curling championship which has also been called the  Nokia Brier Labatt Brier, and Macdonald Brier. The winner of the Brier goes on to compete as Team Canada at the World Championships of the same year.

Team sports

Baseball, fastball, slowpitch
Many recreational leagues abound around the province, and baseball, fastball, or slowpitch games are featured in many community festivals, rodeos and reunion gatherings.

The Western Major Baseball League or WMBL is a summer amateur college wood-bat semi-pro baseball league, which features several Saskatchewan teams in the East and Central Divisions. The Western Division features Alberta teams.

In the past Saskatchewan has seen a few professional baseball clubs pass through. The Saskatoon Riot and Regina Cyclones were formed in 1994 and were members of the North Central League. The NCL was an independent league, meaning it was not a part of Minor League Baseball and none of its teams were affiliated with Major League Baseball clubs. The league featured teams in Saskatchewan, North Dakota, South Dakota and Minnesota.

In 1995 the Riot and Cyclones left the NCL to form their own league called the Prairie League. This league also saw the creation of a third Saskatchewan-based team, the Moose Jaw Diamond Dogs. The Prairie League was also an independent league. As well as teams in Saskatchewan, the Prairie League saw teams in Manitoba, North Dakota, South Dakota, Minnesota and Wisconsin. It lasted only three seasons, folding in 1997. The Diamond Dogs did not finish out the 1997 season, folding in July. Diamond Dogs players were dispersed amongst the remaining teams in the Prairie League.

The most recent attempt at professional baseball in Saskatchewan came in 2003. The Canadian Baseball League which was formed in the winter of 2001–02, initially anticipated its first pitch in the spring of 2002. It was intended to be a Western Canadian league with a team in Saskatoon and a team in Regina. it later decided to postpone its first season until the spring of 2003, in the hopes of becoming a truly national league. This also meant that the Regina franchise was no longer in the league's plans. The Saskatoon Legends were the province's lone representative in the league. Unlike the NCL and Prairie League before it, the CBL saw itself more as an alternative league, as opposed to an independent league. The CBL wanted to be seen as an alternative to Major League Baseball akin to the Nippon Pro Baseball in Japan and the Korea Baseball Organization in South Korea. Poor promotion and low attendance in most league cities saw the CBL abbreviate its first season at the All-Star break in July 2003. The intention was to revamp the league for the 2004 season, but those plans were quietly dropped in the winter of 2003.

Since then very little has arisen on the professional baseball front. There are signs of promise in Saskatoon as the Northern League had intentions of placing an expansion franchise in Saskatoon, should a local ownership group arise. In order to gauge interest in baseball, the Northern League in conjunction with the Saskatoon Yellow Jackets held a showcase game between the Edmonton Cracker-Cats and the Calgary Vipers in May 2007. Fan support impressed the ownership of the Cracker-Cats. After the game, the ownership announced that since Telus Field in Edmonton is unavailable in July 2008, the Cracker-Cats would play that month in Saskatoon at J.F. Cairns Field.
However, after the Cracker-Cats and Vipers' move to the Golden Baseball League (GBL), the Northern League was no longer interested in placing a franchise in Saskatoon. The GBL did have interest in placing a franchise in Saskatoon for the 2010 or 2011 season, rumoured to be the Saskatchewan Silver Sox team that currently plays in the Arizona Winter League, but this did not happen.

The Canadian Baseball Hall of Fame and the Saskatchewan Baseball Hall of Fame honours achievements in Canadian baseball. Dave Shury from Saskatchewan was one of the more recently selected candidates.

Basketball
Top-level basketball in Saskatchewan has a long history in the province. Professionally, Saskatchewan has seen three teams in four leagues. The first was the Saskatchewan Storm, who played in the World Basketball League from 1990 until the league's collapse in 1992. The Storm played the majority of its games at what is now known as Credit Union Centre in Saskatoon. However, each season a few games were played at what is now known as the Brandt Centre in Regina. The WBL was a summer league created in 1988, which featured teams in many states and in Alberta, Saskatchewan, Manitoba, Ontario and Nova Scotia. The unique thing about the WBL was it also had a height restriction for its players.

With the failure of the WBL, the owners of the Canadian teams met and created a new league called the National Basketball League. The feeling in Saskatoon was that the franchise needed a new image to help people forget about the failure in 1992. A fan "name the team" contest was held and the winning entry was the Saskatoon Slam. The team no longer needed to appeal to the entire province as the Storm had, therefore held their entire home schedule in Saskatoon at what is now known as Credit Union Centre. The NBL tipped off in 1993 and featured teams in Saskatchewan, Manitoba, Ontario, Quebec and Nova Scotia. Unlike the WBL, the league had no height restriction and as a result teams featured players over the  mark. The league was fraught with problems during its initial season and saw the Montreal Dragons fold early into the inaugural campaign and the Hamilton Skyhawks moved to Edmonton for their playoff games. As well, the entire 1993 NBL Final was held in Saskatoon, as the Cape Breton Breakers did not have enough money to travel back to Sydney, Nova Scotia, for their home games. In the best-of-five series, Saskatoon did win the championship three games to one and in the process won the only professional league title in Saskatoon's history. The NBL returned for a second season in 1994, but folded part way through that season.

Professional basketball was essentially non-existent in Saskatchewan in the years between 1994 and 1999. The Toronto Raptors played the Atlanta Hawks in a National Basketball Association pre-season contest at what is now known as the Credit Union Centre, in the fall of 1995. The Winnipeg Cyclones and Minot Magic City Snowbears of the International Basketball Association staged an exhibition game at what is now known as Credit Union Centre in the fall of 1996. As well the Harlem Globetrotters held various shows during those years.

In January 2000, the Mansfield Hawks of the International Basketball Association, moved to Saskatoon mid-way through the 1999–2000 season to become the Saskatchewan Hawks. The IBA was a league that was based mainly in the Midwestern United States, with the lone Canadian team prior to Saskatchewan's entry, being the Winnipeg Cyclone. The Hawks finished the 1999–2000 season at what is now known as the Credit Union Centre and played the 2000–01 season in the IBA as well. During the 2000–01 season, a rival league called the Continental Basketball Association folded due to what is thought of as mismanagement by the league owner Isiah Thomas. During the summer of 2001, a group of former CBA owners purchased the assets of the league. In order to field teams for the 2001–02 season, the CBA ownership convinced the Hawks' IBA and another league, the International Basketball League to merge and many of its member clubs became CBA teams. The Hawks were one of these clubs to join the CBA. The Hawks' poor performance on the court, coupled with poor attendance figures, saw the team quietly fold during the summer of 2002.

Briefly, Saskatoon held another professional basketball team, the Saskatchewan Prairie Wolves. The team was intended to play in the International Basketball League during the 2008 season. The prospective ownership ran into problems with various factors surrounding the franchise and the team was quietly folded in March 2007.

Top level amateur basketball is also featured in Saskatchewan. The University of Regina Cougars and the University of Saskatchewan Huskies are men's and women's teams which compete in Canadian Interuniversity Sport. The Saskatchewan Huskies men's team made history and won their first ever CIS Championship in the 2009-2010 season under head coach Barry Rawlyk. Three members of the squad were named CIS Championship Tournament All-Stars, one of which was also named tournament MVP. The Regina Cougars success has been just as brief. The Cougars' women's team won the CIS championship in the 2000–01 season. The CIS women's basketball tournament was held in Saskatchewan in March 2008, with the University of Saskatchewan hosting the tournament.

Lastly, one of the most prestigious boys high school tournaments is held in Saskatchewan. The Bedford Road Invitational Tournament boys high school basketball tournament is held at Bedford Road Collegiate in Saskatoon in early January every year. This tournament has featured teams from across Canada, the United States, Australia and  Taiwan. The most famous team to ever participate at BRIT was the New York Gauchos AAU team, which featured a number of future NCAA and NBA stars on its roster.

Football

The Hardy Trophy is a Canadian sports trophy awarded to the winner of the Canada West Football Conference.   The winners of the Uteck Bowl (formerly Atlantic Bowl) and the Mitchell Bowl (formerly the Churchill Bowl) compete to achieve the Vanier Cup which is the championship trophy of Canadian Interuniversity Sport CIS. The University of Saskatchewan Huskies and Regina Rams compete in Canadian Interuniversity Sport.

Currently, the Huskies are recognized as one of the top programs in Canada, due to their success in recent years. They have won three Vanier Cup championship and participated in six more. The Huskies have also won 19 Hardy Trophy championships as Canada West Universities Athletic Association (CWUAA) champions. The Rams on the other hand have not achieved the same level of success as the Huskies. Mainly this is due to the Rams being a fairly new CIS program. The Rams affiliated themselves with the University of Regina in time for the 1999 season. They won the Hardy Trophy in 2000 and advanced to the Vanier Cup, losing to the Ottawa Gee-Gees 42-39. However, prior to joining the CIS, the Rams were widely considered one of the top CJFL programs. They captured 15 Canadian Bowl championships during their tenure.

Canadian Junior Football League has two Saskatchewan teams competing in the Prairie Football Conference; Saskatoon Hilltops and Regina Prairie Thunder. Previous Regina teams were the Regina Bombers, Regina Dales, Regina Pats, and Regina Rams. The Regina Rams joined with the University of Regina Canadian Interuniversity Sport CIS in 1999. There was at one time also, the Moose Jaw Maroons.

The Canadian Football League is a professional football league. The Saskatchewan Roughriders were called the Regina Rugby Club, Regina Roughriders and nicknamed the "Western Riders" or "Green Riders". The Saskatchewan Roughriders  belong to the Western Interprovincial Football Union (WIFU). The winners of the Western Conference Final and the Eastern Conference final meet to achieve the Grey Cup. The Canadian Football League West Division organisation has evolved from the Western Canada Rugby Football Union, WCRFU; Western Interprovincial Football Union, WIFU; Western Football Conference, WFC; to the present format called the West Division.  Saskatchewan Roughriders home games are played at Mosaic Stadium at Taylor Field in Regina, Saskatchewan. On November 25, 2007, the Riders played the Winnipeg Blue Bombers in the 95th Grey Cup, Saskatchewan won 23 – 19. The Canadian Football Hall of Fame honours achievements in Canadian football, of which the Riders have several members.

Ice hockey

Professional hockey existed in Saskatchewan during the 1920s. The Western Canada Hockey League was the prairie equivalent of the National Hockey League and began in the winter of 1921. Its champion played the winner of the Pacific Coast Hockey Association to determine who would represent the West in the Stanley Cup finals. Saskatchewan saw three franchises during this time. Initially, the Saskatoon Sheiks and Regina Capitals were among the founding franchises in the WCHL. However, that was short-lived as during the league's inaugural season in 1921–22, the Sheiks moved to Moose Jaw. However, the Moose Jaw Sheiks did not return for the 1922–23 season and were replaced by a new team in Saskatoon called the Crescents. The Saskatoon Crescents played under that name only for the 1922–23 season, reverting to the Sheiks for the 1923–24 season. The Regina Capitals moved to Portland after the 1924–25 season, leaving the Sheiks as the only Saskatchewan team in the league. The WCHL folded after the 1925–26 season leaving Saskatchewan devoid of professional hockey for nearly 30 years.

The Saskatoon Quakers were a professional hockey team in the Pacific Coast Hockey League. They were a senior amateur team prior to joining the PCHL in 1951. They captured the PCHL championship that initial season of 1951–52. The PCHL changed its name to the Western Hockey League in time for the 1952–53 season. The Quakers played in the WHL until they folded after the 1955–56 season, citing financial concerns. Saskatoon saw the WHL return for the 1958–59 season: a shared team called the Saskatoon/St. Paul Regals played that season. The team split its home games between Saskatoon and St. Paul, Minnesota. The experiment was short lived as the Regals folded after that season. The brothers Reg, Doug, and Max Bentley from Delisle were famous hockey players that played with the Saskatoon Quakers

Although no professional hockey team has operated in Saskatchewan since 1959, interest in bringing a major professional franchise to the province (most likely to Saskatoon) continues to persist.  Proponents of such ventures have generally argued that even though at first glance a city like Saskatoon might seem far to small to sustain a National Hockey League club, a franchise could nevertheless be viable if supported by the entire province in a manner similar to the support enjoyed by the Roughriders.

The first serious plan to bring professional hockey back to Saskatchewan came in the latter half of the 1970s when Saskatoon native Bill Hunter, after selling the World Hockey Association's Edmonton Oilers, pursued the re-location of a struggling WHA franchise to Saskatoon in hopes of having it included in the eventual NHL-WHA merger. However, this effort came to nothing due to opposition from other WHA owners concerned that the inclusion of a Saskatoon franchise would upset the delicate merger negotiations with the NHL, as well as (perhaps on account of such uncertainty) Hunter's inability to get a commitment for a new facility to replace the small and aging Saskatoon Arena. Following the merger, Hunter made another attempt in 1983 when he purchased the bankrupt St. Louis Blues and formally applied for a franchise re-location to Saskatoon.  Although this time Hunter would secure commitments for 18,000 season tickets and a new arena in downtown Saskatoon, the NHL blocked both the sale the re-location and an owner willing to keep the Blues in St. Louis was found.

Following the completion of Saskatchewan Place (now Credit Union Centre), an ownership group applied for a Saskatoon-based franchise to join the NHL as part of the league's early 1990s expansion.  Although the bid was withdrawn prior to the NHL owners making their decision, the prospect that an NHL franchise might still come to Saskatchewan persisted after the league regularly included Saskatchewan Place as a venue for a series of neutral site games included as part of the league's expanded 84 game schedule starting with the 1992–93 NHL season.  However, the league scrapped the neutral site games after reverting to an 82-game schedule following the 1994-95 NHL lockout, and serious interest in bringing an NHL team to Saskatchewan declined through the latter half of the 1990s and the 2000s after the re-locations of the original Winnipeg Jets and Quebec Nordiques to American cities appeared (at least at the time) to offer ample evidence that an NHL franchise in Saskatchewan could not be financially viable, especially while the Canadian dollar traded at a significant discount to the U.S. dollar.

However, a number of changed circumstances since then, including the introduction of a salary cap following the 2004-05 NHL lockout, a return of the exchange rate to parity, a relatively strong provincial economy and reports of a number of U.S. franchises struggling has led to speculation that Saskatchewan may again attempt to acquire an NHL franchise.  The league has been scheduling exhibition games at Credit Union Centre with some regularity since the lockout.  Following the NHL takeover of the bankrupt Phoenix Coyotes, a Canadian-American ownership group called Ice Edge Holdings that was negotiating to purchase the Coyotes announced their intention to play a limited number of Coyotes home games at Credit Union Centre as part of an overall plan to keep the team based in Arizona.  While it was speculated that this might have been part of a larger bid to prove the viability of Saskatoon as an NHL city, Ice Edge's negotiations with the NHL eventually fell through.

With the return of the Winnipeg Jets again leaving Saskatchewan the only Canadian province outside Atlantic Canada without an NHL franchise, interest in bringing an NHL team to Saskatchewan where it would serve as a natural rival to the Jets has been further renewed.  In early 2012 Saskatoon mayor Don Atchison announced that On Ice Management Group Inc. had approached him with plans to place an NHL franchise in a renovated Credit Union Centre – it is not yet known if On Ice Management Group is related in any way to the former Ice Edge group.  Shortly afterward, in an interview NHL Commissioner Gary Bettman included Saskatoon in a list of cities that had expressed recent interest in acquiring a franchise, although the commissioner did not indicate how serious he thought that interest might have been.

There have also been repeated efforts to bring minor league professional hockey back to Saskatoon, since Saskatoon's arena and market are undoubtedly large enough to support an American Hockey League franchise.  The most recent serious attempt came in the midst the 2004-05 NHL lockout when the Edmonton Oilers proposed re-locating their AHL Roadrunners franchise to Credit Union Centre.  The proposal fell through and the franchise eventually suspended operations.  Earlier in the 1990s after the International Hockey League's Manitoba Moose replaced the original Jets in Winnipeg, an independent IHL franchise in Saskatoon to serve as a natural rival to the Moose was proposed but never realized.  More recently, Saskatoon was briefly considered as a possible destination for the Moose upon the return of the Jets, however Jets/Moose owners True North Sports and Entertainment eventually chose St. John's, Newfoundland as the franchise's new home.  A major obstacle to bringing a minor league professional hockey team to Saskatoon is the lease the Saskatoon Blades of the Western Hockey League have for Credit Union Centre.  According to the Blades' owners, their current lease can be abrogated for an NHL franchise but not a minor league team.

Top-level amateur hockey in Saskatchewan comes in a few forms. The Saskatoon Blades, Swift Current Broncos, Prince Albert Raiders, Moose Jaw Warriors and Regina Pats play in the Major Junior Western Hockey League. The University of Saskatchewan Huskies and University of Regina Cougars play in the Canada West Universities Athletic Association. Lastly, several Saskatchewan teams participate in the Junior A Saskatchewan Junior Hockey League.

The University Cup is awarded annually to the Canadian Interuniversity Sport men's ice hockey champions, of which the University of Regina Cougars and the University of Saskatchewan Huskies are the Saskatchewan teams in this league. There are also women's University of Regina Cougars and the University of Saskatchewan Huskies teams which compete in Canadian Interuniversity Sport. The University Cup tournament was held at the Credit Union Centre in Saskatoon for three seasons between 1998 and 2000. Prior to this, the University of Saskatchewan held a Christmas tournament, called Chill Out, which attracted teams from the rest of Canada, the NCAA and occasionally Europe.

Tier I, Junior A men's (Under 20)  Saskatchewan teams comprise the East Division of the Eastern Conference of the Western Hockey League. Teams compete to achieve the Ed Chynoweth Cup within the Western Hockey League (WHL) with the winner moving on to compete for the Canadian Hockey League Memorial Cup championship. The Memorial Cup has been captured by the Regina Pats four times. The Swift Current Broncos and Prince Albert Raiders have each won the championship once. The Saskatoon Blades have participated in the tournament once, losing in the final to the Broncos in 1989. The Moose Jaw Warriors have yet to compete in the Memorial Cup.

Internationally, the International Ice Hockey Federation IIHF World U-20 Hockey Championship or World Junior Ice Hockey Championship give teams a chance to compete on the world-wide level to achieve gold status. The World Junior tournament was held in Saskatoon in 1991. It was at this tournament that Canada defeated the Soviet Union to capture the Gold Medal and also solidify the general public's interest in this tournament.

Saskatchewan's Tier II, Junior A men's teams compete in the Saskatchewan Junior Hockey League. This league is a division of Canadian Junior A Hockey League. Currently, the SJHL consists of 12 teams from throughout the province, including one from Manitoba (the Flin Flon Bombers). The teams compete for the Credential Cup and the right to advance to the Anavet Cup against the Manitoba Junior Hockey League champion. If they win that series, they move on to the Canadian championship called the Royal Bank Cup. The Prince Albert Raiders have won the tournament three times, the Weyburn Red Wings twice and the Notre Dame Hounds and Humboldt Broncos once each.

At this level internationally, the IIHF has created a tournament known as the World Junior A Challenge. This tournament, created in 2006, was first held in Humboldt and Estevan. It featured teams from Europe and North America, including two teams from Canada.

The champions of the North Saskatchewan Junior B Hockey League and the Prairie Junior Hockey League compete to achieve the Saskatchewan Provincial Junior B Hockey Championship to see who goes on to play for the Keystone Cup, the Junior "B" ice hockey championship and trophy for Western Canada. Whereas the Saskatchewan Junior C Hockey League is a Junior "C" ice hockey league.

The Telus Cup, or the Air Canada Cup and Wrigley Cup, is Canada's national midget hockey championship.

Saskatchewan Prairie Ice is a senior women's ice hockey team based out of Lumsden, Saskatchewan. Champions of the Western Women's Hockey League (WWHL), are awarded the WWHL Champions cup. The Esso Women's Nationals's offers the Abby Hoffman Cup for the top competitors in the  WWHL and the Canadian Women's Hockey League.

Lacrosse

, the Saskatchewan SWAT lacrosse team competes in Tier I, Junior B division of the  Rocky Mountain Lacrosse League (RMLL) (Alberta Lacrosse Association). The SWAT are composed of players under the age of 21 and as they are a Saskatchewan all-star team, automatically earn the right to represent Saskatchewan at the Founders Cup tournament.

The Prairie Gold Lacrosse League  (Saskatchewan Lacrosse Association) or Saskatchewan Major Box Lacrosse League, is a Junior B box lacrosse league which comprises 8 Saskatchewan teams, 4 in the north division, and again 4 in the south division. The league also integrates two senior level teams with the Junior B teams. As a result, these two teams do not participate in the same playoffs as the Junior B teams. Instead, the Saskatoon Brewers and Regina Heat play against each other to determine a Saskatchewan senior champion. The senior champion is not eligible to participate in the Mann Cup tournament.

The Saskatchewan Rush of the National Lacrosse League, in their first year of competition, 2016, the Rush won both their Division Title and the League Championship.

Rugby
Rugby has been an active Saskatchewan sport as early as 1927, with the Saskwanis Rugby Team being inducted into the Saskatchewan Sports Hall of Fame as the Western Canadian Rugby Champions.
Saskatchewan Prairie Fire is one of the Rugby Canada Super League teams. It plays its home matches at the Regina Rugby Club in Regina. As it represents the entire Saskatchewan Rugby Union, its roster consists of players from across Saskatchewan. As well, since the RCSL is a semi-pro league, the Prairie Fire carries a few international imports on its roster every year as well.

Since the RCSL's inception in 1998, the Prairie Fire have been amongst the West Division's top teams. They have captured three straight West Division championships, losing in 2005 and 2006 to the Newfoundland Rock. The 2007 championship was decided on August 18, 2007, in Regina, with the Prairie Fire capturing the MacTier Cup 28-12 over the Niagara Thunder.

Soccer

1905 saw the establishment of the Saskatchewan Soccer Association in Grenfell.
Professional soccer, has a very short history in Saskatchewan. In the late 1990s, the Edmonton Drillers of the Major Indoor Soccer League held a few of their home games at the Credit Union Centre. These matches were used as a test to see if professional indoor soccer could survive in Saskatoon. The matches were successful attendance wise, but did not materialize in an MISL expansion franchise being awarded to Saskatoon.

In 2003, the Calgary Storm, of the USL First Division outdoor soccer league, held a regular season game against the Vancouver Whitecaps at Griffiths Stadium. Again, this was a test to see if Saskatoon could support an outdoor soccer team. Again, the attendance seemed to say yes, but no expansion franchises ever materialized.

The newest attempt at professional soccer in Saskatchewan, comes by way of the Canadian Major Indoor Soccer League. It was established in 2007 and saw Saskatoon awarded a charter franchise. This franchise was called the Saskatoon Accelerators. The 2007 "season" was simply a series of exhibition matches between the four teams in the CMISL. However, Saskatoon won both their matches and was the only team of the four to go undefeated during this Showcase Series. The league will begin regular play on January 13, 2008, with the Accelerators hosting the Calgary United FC at Credit Union Centre. The league also has designs on establishing an outdoor summer league with companion franchises in each of the indoor teams' cities.

The University of Regina Cougars woman's soccer team and the University of Saskatchewan Huskies men's and women's soccer teams compete in Canadian Interuniversity Sport.

Some Saskatchewan players who have made history in soccer have been Norman Sheldon, David Greyeyes Steele, and Lorne Gray. The Sons of England Football team was one Saskatchewan notable teams which played as early as 1910 in Saskatchewan. Teams would compete for the Holmes Cup and Caswell Cup.

Volleyball

The University of Regina Cougars and the University of Saskatchewan Huskies are men's and women's volleyball teams which compete in Canadian Interuniversity Sport.

Saskatoon also held a major international volleyball tournament in 1999. The FIVB Women's Under-20 Volleyball World Championship. It was played at Credit Union Centre and saw top volleyball teams from around the world descend upon the city. Russia won the tournament defeating Brazil in the final.

Individual sports

Motor racing
Saskatchewan International Raceway SIR, is a drag racing facility.  Kings Park Speedway and Auto Clearing Motor Speedway are paved oval racing venues primarily used for stock car racing. As well, there are various dirt racetracks across Saskatchewan that feature midget racing and other modified racing. Martensville Speedway in Martensville, Saskatchewan features go kart racing. Several other forms of racing exist in Saskatchewan such as rally racing, ice rallying and snowmobile racing.

Saskatoon used to host F1 Powerboat Racing on the South Saskatchewan River. The event was known as the Great Northern River Roar was an annual stop on the Champboat Series tour, and featured some of the top names in the sport such as the Seebold family. Unfortunately, Canadian tobacco advertising laws caused the event to lose title sponsorship and after one year of cobbled together local support, the event folded. During its time in Saskatchewan, pilots heralded the event as the Indy 500 of powerboat racing, meaning it was the most prestigious to win. The course was also noted for being very dangerous as the pillars for the bridges coupled with the tight turns made for skilled piloting of the boats on the river.

Many other cities and lakes feature personal water craft or Sea-Doo racing. As well, several water skiing and Sea-Doo stunt events are held around the province.

Golf

Many Saskatchewan communities feature 9 or 18-hole sand greens or grass greens golf courses. The Saskatchewan Sports Hall of Fame has inducted 10 golfers from Saskatchewan between its inception 1966 and 2007.  Dr. Jack Leddy, Barbara Turnbull, Pat Fletcher, Dr. Robert D. Reid, Joanne Goulet, Thomas (Tom) Ross, Phil Lederhouse, James Joseph (Jim) Scissons, Gordon Keith Rever, and Geraldine Street.

One of the first Saskatchewan golf courses was a four hole course in Regina, Assiniboia, North West Territories located where the Crescents area now stands. In 1899 this golf course was expanded to a 9-hole course. The Wascana Country Club was designed in 1911, and was one of the more prestigious courses of Saskatchewan. Presently Elk Ridge Resort and Waskesiu Golf Course near the Prince Albert National Park is one of the best known across Canada. This 27-hole championship course features links stretching from 5,200 to 6,800-yards.

The provincial amateur sport governing body is Golf Saskatchewan.

Horse racing
Marquis Downs is a horse race track in Saskatoon for both Thoroughbred and Standardbred horse racing. Horse trainers, owners and jockeys can compete in the Saskatchewan Derby, Prairie Lily Sales Stake, Saskatchewan Futurity and on Heritage Day.  Cathy Wedge, Olympic level equestrian rider, has been inducted into both Saskatoon and Saskatchewan Hall of Fames.  Robin Hahn from Belle Plaine is both rider and builder of the equestrian arena. Gina Smith and her horse Malte III competed internationally.

Skating
The 2009 Canadian Figure Skating Championships were held in Saskatoon.

Skiing, ski jump

Before Blackstrap Mountain was constructed for the Canada Winter Games, ski enthusiasts would use the Saskatoon Ski Jump constructed on the south side of the South Saskatchewan River weir.  Both cross country and downhill skiing are enjoyed in the winter monther of Saskatchewan at Table Mountain and Blackstrap Mountain ski hills, and various scenic cross country ski trails associated with parks and golf courses. Water skiers make use of lake and river water ways. Blackstrap, Buffalo Pound, Duck Mountain, Mission Ridge, Mount Joy Ski Club, Ochapowace Mountain, Ski Timber Ridge, Table Mountain, Twin Towers Ski Area, White Track Mission Ridge Winter Park, and Wapiti Valley are all Saskatchewan ski resorts offering down hill skiing opportunities.

Cross Country Saskatchewan (CCS) develops programs and training for the CCC Level, Sask Sport and Sask Ski.

Water sports; diving, swimming, water ski, wakeboard
Swimming pools were constructed between 1910 and 1920 in some Saskatchewan communities. Before this time natural geographical features such as lakes and rivers were the only seasonal medium in which to swim. Four gold medals were achieved by Phyllis Dewar of Moose Jaw in 1934  Swim Saskatchewan promotes the development of the swimming sport in Saskatchewan.  The University of Regina Cougars coach swimmers who compete in Canadian Interuniversity Sport.
The Provincial Sport Governing Body for the Sport of Diving is Sask Diving Inc.
The official governing body for water skiing and wakeboarding in Saskatchewan is Water Ski and Wakeboard Saskatchewan which comes together with Water Ski and Wakeboard Canada for events, tournaments and championships.

Track and field/Cross country running
The University of Regina Cougars and the University of Saskatchewan Huskies feature track and field and cross country athletes who compete in U SPORTS.

Wrestling, boxing, judo, weight-lifting
The University of Regina Cougars and the University of Saskatchewan Huskies feature wrestling athletes who compete in Canadian Interuniversity Sport.

His Worship Pat Fiacco Sugar Ray Fiacco, Mayor of Regina has held provincial and Canadian amateur boxing championships, such as the Canadas amateur bantam weight crown 1980.

Judo is practiced in many communities across the province.  The formal name of the non-profit organization is the Saskatchewan Kodokan Black Belt Association, but is more commonly known as Judo Saskatchewan. Clubs in the province include:
Ka-newonaskasehtew Judo Club, PunnichyJu-No-Ri Judo Club, WatrousKoseikan Judo Club, Moose JawLaRonge Judo ClubLloydminster Judo ClubMelfort Judo ClubKenshukan Judo Club, Prince AlbertMeadow Lake Judo ClubPense Judo ClubRegina YMCA Judo ClubSaskatoon YMCA Judo ClubSenshudokan Judo Club, ReginaSouth Corman Park Judo Club, SaskatoonSt. Brieux Judo ClubStanley Mission Judo ClubSwift Current Judo ClubVibank Judo Club  The organization holds several regional competitions each season, four provincial tournaments, a closed provincial championships and a one primary annual shiai (tournament) called the Sask Open.  Saskatchewan has produced two olympic athletes, Nancy Jewitt-Filteau and Frazer Will and has had several other olympic athletes train and coach in the province, including Sandra Greaves and Ewan Beaton.

Sports and recreation

Participation
Russ Kisby (BAPE'63, LLD'96) University of Saskatchewan alumni was one of the founders of participACTION which started in 1972 and was replaced by  In Motion  in the year 2000. ParticipACTION promoted a healthy lifestyle, physical activity, and nutritional diet to increase health and well being.

Saskatchewan in motion
Encourages physical activity by all Saskatchewan residents. The Saskatchewan In Motion campaign will proceed on four areas, building partnerships such as Saskatchewan Parks and Recreation Association Inc., Saskatoon Health Region, SaskCulture Inc. and Sask Sport Inc., raising awareness, mobilizing communities as well as monitoring and celebrating success.

Multi-sport events

Canada Games
The Canada Games are a multi-sport competition akin to the Olympic Games. These games are held every two years, alternating between summer and winter events. Each summer games or winter games are held every four years. It is a national event with teams representing every province in Canada. The 1971 Canada Winter Games and the 1989 Canada Summer Games were both hosted in  Saskatoon. The 2005 Canada Summer Games were hosted in Regina.

Western Canada Summer Games
The Western Canada Summer Games are a multi-sport event akin to the Olympic Games. Participants come from the three Western provinces (Alberta, Saskatchewan and Manitoba; previously this list included British Columbia, who withdrew participation following the 2015 Games) and the three Northern territories (Yukon Territory, Northwest Territories and Nunavut). It has been held in Saskatchewan five times: Regina in 1975 and 1987, Saskatoon in 1979, Prince Albert in 1999 and Swift Current in 2019.

Saskatchewan Games
The Saskatchewan Games are a multi-sport event akin to the aforementioned competitions. The purpose of the Saskatchewan Games is to provide an opportunity for the province's developing athletes, coaches and officials to participate in a multi sport event in preparation for a higher level of competition. The participants are divided by nine Sport, Culture and Recreation Districts;  South East,  Prairie Central,  Parkland Valley,  Lakeland,  Rivers West,  South West,  Regina,  Saskatoon and  Northern. These districts then compete against each other.  Like the Canada Games, this event is biennial, with a Winter or Summer Games occurring every two years. Each Winter Games or Summer Games is held quadrennially.

Can-Am Police and Fire Games
The Can-Am Police and Fire Games are a multi-sport competition, exclusive to members of law enforcement and fire fighting. This competition features sports common to the Olympic Games, but is unique in that it also features competitions specific to various duties of a police officer or fire fighter. The participants are generally drawn from police services or fire departments from across Canada and the United States. However, some members from Europe and Australia have participated, as well as members of Canada Border Services Agency and the various law enforcement agencies of the United States Department of Justice. Regina held the competition in 1998 to coincide with the 125th anniversary of the Royal Canadian Mounted Police. Saskatoon hosted the event in 2008. The games have been held biennially since 1996, with the 2006 Games cancelled because of Hurricane Katrina.

Notable Saskatchewan sports personalities

Roger Aldag from Gull Lake, Saskatchewan was a Canadian football offensive lineman who played for the Saskatchewan Roughriders from 1976 through 1992 and was inducted into the Canadian Football Hall of Fame.
Mary Geraldine (Bonnie) Baker, née George all-star catcher in the All-American Girls Professional Baseball League
Ethel Mary Catherwood or "The Saskatoon Lily" from Saskatoon, Saskatchewan was a Canadian track and field athlete.
Rick Folk curling skip of the winning team in the 1980 Labatt Brier.
Emile Francis (b. 1926)
George Patrick Genereux was a Canadian Gold medal winning trap shooter and physician from Saskatoon.
Gordon "Gordie" Howe OC from Floral, Saskatchewan, was a professional ice hockey player known as Mr. Hockey".
William Dickenson ("Wild Bill") Hunter CM from Saskatoon was a Canadian hockey owner, general manager, coach and founder of the Western Hockey League.
Diane Jones-Konihowski C.M., B.Ed. is an Olympic pentathlete.
Catriona Le May Doan, O.C. from Saskatoon, Saskatchewan is a Canadian speed skater and a double Olympic champion in the 500 m.
Rueben Mayes from North Battleford, Saskatchewan is a former National Football League running back with the New Orleans Saints and Seattle Seahawks.
Michael ("Mike") Mintenko from Moose Jaw, Saskatchewan is a silver Olympic medalist and a freestyle and butterfly swimmer
Blair Morgan from Prince Albert, Saskatchewan is a multi-time CMRC Canadian National championship-winning motocross racer, World Snocross snowmobile champion and a 5-times X-Games gold medalist
Jason Parker, from Yorkton, Saskatchewan is a Canadian speed skater and an Olympic Silver Medalist from the 2006 Winter Olympics in Torino, Italy.
Terry Stephen Puhl of Melville, Saskatchewan, Canada is a former professional baseball player.
Glenn "Chico" Resch from Moose Jaw, Saskatchewan was a professional ice hockey goaltender
Ernest M. Richardson C.M. from Stoughton, Saskatchewan is a Canadian and world curling champion.
Jon Ryan from Regina, Saskatchewan is a punter in the NFL.
Sandra Schmirler SOM was a Canadian curler, an Olympic and triple World Champion.
Eddie Shore from Fort Qu'Appelle, Saskatchewan was a professional NHL ice hockey player.
Meaghan Simister from Regina, Saskatchewan is a Canadian Olympic luger.
Bryan Trottier is a forward with the New York Islanders and Pittsburgh Penguins of the NHL.

Media
Johnny Esaw (June 11, 1925 – April 6, 2013) was a Canadian sports broadcaster from North Battleford, Saskatchewan.  Darren Dutchyshen from Porcupine Plain, Saskatchewan is a co-host of TSN's evening edition of SportsCentre.  Martine Gaillard from Melfort, Saskatchewan is a Canadian sports television personality currently working for Rogers Sportsnet. Mike Toth from Moose Jaw is currently the lead anchor on the evening edition of Sportsnet Connected.

Several other personalities on Canada's sports networks have also spent time in Saskatchewan. Peter Loubardias, currently the voice of Canadian Hockey League games on Rogers Sportsnet, was at one time the host of Sportsline on then-STV (now Global) in Saskatoon. As well, Roger Millions, the current voice of the Calgary Flames on Rogers Sportsnet was also on Sportsline on then-STV in Saskatoon. R.J. Broadhead who is host of Sportsnet Connected on Rogers Sportsnet, was also the sports reporter on Global Saskatoon's evening newscasts. Jay Onrait is currently an anchor on Fox Sports Live on Fox Sports 1 in the United States; at one point, he was the sports director at Global Saskatoon.

Other

These are some additional sports to be highlighted in the provincial sports arena. 1938 saw the Regina Rowing Club Team achieving the Canadian Fours Champions to earn them a spot in the Saskatchewan Sports Hall of Fame The following year celebrated another sport, with the Saskatoon Gun Club Trap Shooting Team being awarded the Dominion Trapshooting Champions to achieve them a nomination for the Saskatchewan Sports Hall of Fame  The Canadian Five Pin Bowling Champions celebrated the Regina Men's Bowling Team in 1953 and they are honoured in the Saskatchewan Sports Hall of Fame as well. A more recent inductee into the Saskatchewan Sports Hall of Fame are the Regina Optimist Stingers Ringette Team who were the Canadian Women's Champions in 1987/1988. Another sport to gain prominence in Saskatchewan honoured in the hall of fame is the Sundown Optimist Buffalo Gals Baton Twirling Team winners of the World Baton Twirling Champions Broomball a sport which is a cross between ice hockey and ringette also achieved provincial status in 1991 when the hall of fame inducted the Regina Silver Screen Bruins Broomball Team .

See also
Sports Culture of Saskatchewan
List of ice hockey teams in Saskatchewan
Saskatchewan Huskies

Curling

 Scotties Tournament of Hearts
 Tim Hortons Brier (Nokia Brier, Labatt Brier, Macdonald Brier)

Baseball

Cairns Field
Arizona Winter League
Saskatoon Legends
Western Major Baseball League

Basketball

Bedford Road Invitational Tournament
Saskatchewan Hawks

Hockey

Credit Union Centre
Esso Women's Nationals
Memorial Cup
North Saskatchewan Junior B Hockey League
Prairie Junior Hockey League
Saskatchewan Provincial Junior B Hockey Championship
Saskatchewan Junior C Hockey League
Saskatchewan Prairie Ice
The Telus Cup, formerly the Air Canada Cup and Wrigley Cup
University Cup
Western Hockey League
Western Women's Hockey League
Saskatchewan Junior Hockey League players
Saskatchewan Junior Hockey League teams

Football

Canadian Football Hall of Fame
Canadian Football League
Canadian Football League West Division
Canadian Junior Football League
Churchill Bowl
Dave Dryburgh Memorial Trophy
Grey Cup
Griffiths Stadium
Hardy Trophy
List of football teams in Canada
Mosaic Stadium at Taylor Field
Mitchell Bowl
Regina Rams
Saskatchewan Roughriders
Uteck Bowl
Vanier Cup

Lacrosse

List of lacrosse teams in Canada
Prairie Gold Lacrosse League
Saskatchewan SWAT
Saskatchewan Rush

Rugby

Rugby Canada
Rugby Canada Super League
Saskatchewan Prairie Fire

Soccer

Canadian Major Indoor Soccer League
Saskatoon Accelerators
Soccer in Saskatchewan

Motor racing

Auto Clearing Motor Speedway
Kings Park Speedway
Saskatchewan International Raceway

Horse racing

Marquis Downs

Multi-sport events

Canada Games

External links
Saskatchewan Sports & Recreation - Government of Saskatchewan
Saskatchewan Sports Hall of Fame
Saskatchewan Sports: Lives Past and Present Book Title Saskatchewan Sports: Lives Past and Present Author Holden Stoffel Publisher Canadian Plains Research Center
Sports and Recreation Entries |Encyclopedia of Saskatchewan

Notes and references